John C. Begovich (January 17, 1916 in Jackson Gate, CA – November 2, 1999 in Amador, CA) served in the California State Senate for the 9th district from 1961 to 1967 and during World War II he served in the United States Army.

In World War II, he "fought in North Africa, Sicily, Italy and France with the 3rd Infantry Division and was awarded a Silver Star and the French Croix de Guerre for bravery under fire. He won a battlefield commission and received three Purple Hearts for combat wounds." {Source: The Sacramento Bee]

1966–1970: U.S. Marshal for California's eastern judicial district
1977–1996: Member, Amador County Board of Supervisors

From Jackson to State Route 88, State Route 49 is named the John C. Begovich Memorial Highway.

References

1916 births
1999 deaths
United States Army personnel of World War II
Members of the California State Legislature
California state senators
American people of Serbian descent
20th-century American politicians
People from Jackson, California
United States Army officers
Recipients of the Croix de Guerre 1939–1945 (France)
Recipients of the Silver Star
Military personnel from California